Belig  (702 m), is a mountain in the Cuillin mountains of the Isle of Skye. It is located in the centre of the island, northeast of the main Black Cuillin range.

A fine and sharp peak, Belig's summit is the culmination of three ridges. It is often climbed in conjunction with its neighbour Garbh-bheinn. The nearest village is Dunan to the east.

References

Grahams
Marilyns of Scotland
Mountains and hills of the Isle of Skye